Balornock is a district in the city of Glasgow, Scotland. Situated outside the city centre, north of the River Clyde, it forms part of the larger area of Springburn.

Balornock shared the Red Road complex of multi-storey flats with the neighbouring district of Barmulloch; the 21 Birnie Court building (single yellow block) was in Barmulloch.  The buildings were formally condemned in July 2008 after a long period of decline, with their phased demolition taking place in three stages between 2010 and 2015.

Local amenities include Stobhill Hospital, The Morven. In 2006 the area was the setting of the award-winning film Red Road by Andrea Arnold.

Noted residents
 Margaret Thomson Davis, writer
 Robert Florence, writer and actor
 Tam McManus, footballer

References

Areas of Glasgow
Springburn